Robert Hilliard Barrow (February 5, 1922 – October 30, 2008) was a United States Marine Corps four-star general. Barrow was the 27th Commandant of the Marine Corps from 1979 to 1983. He served for 41 years, including overseas command duty in World War II, the Korean War and the Vietnam War. Barrow was awarded the Navy Cross and Distinguished Service Cross for extraordinary heroism in Korea and Vietnam, respectively.

Early life
Barrow was born on February 5, 1922, in Baton Rouge, Louisiana, and grew up on his family's Rosale Plantation in West Feliciana Parish, Louisiana. The family's circumstances were difficult. They had no electricity, so Barrow satisfied an early passion for reading by using a kerosene lamp.

Because it offered free tuition and low boarding costs, Barrow attended Louisiana State University from 1939 to 1942, working as a waiter and a janitor and served in the university's Corps of Cadets.

Marine Corps career

World War II
In 1942, Barrow left the university early to join the United States Marine Corps. He attended recruit training at Marine Corps Recruit Depot San Diego and was retained as a Drill Instructor after his graduation. While serving on the drill field, he was selected to attend Officer Candidate School in February 1943. He was commissioned a second lieutenant on May 19, 1943.

Barrow served in China during World War II. He was a first lieutenant in the United States Navy Group China, Sino-American Cooperative Organization (SACO) from August 1944 to November 1945. SACO was a United States trained and equipped Chinese guerilla team in Japanese-occupied Central China. Barrow is said by his son to have described his China service as one of his "most vivid experiences". For his service, he was awarded the Bronze Star Medal with Combat "V".

Korean War
Barrow commanded Company A, 1st Battalion, 1st Marines during the Korean War and participated in the Inchon-Seoul campaign and in the Chosin Reservoir campaign. He has been described as the "finest company commander" of the Korean War. For his heroism in holding a pass near Koto-ri on December 9–10, 1950, he was awarded the Navy Cross.

Barrow's Navy Cross citation reads:

Interwar years
In February 1956, Barrow began an 18-month tour with the 2nd Battalion, 6th Marines at Camp Lejeune, North Carolina. From the summer of 1957 to the summer of 1960, he served as the Marine Officer Instructor, at the Tulane University Naval Reserve Officer Training Corps. In September 1959, he was promoted to lieutenant colonel. Barrow graduated from the National War College in June 1968.

Vietnam War
Barrow served in the Vietnam War as commanding officer of the 9th Marine Regiment, 3rd Marine Division (Rein) and was a Deputy G-3 in the III Marine Amphibious Force. While in command of the 9th Marines, he saw combat near the DMZ, Khe Sanh, Da Krong Valley, and A Shau Valley. He received the Distinguished Service Cross for his extraordinary heroism in Operation Dewey Canyon.

Barrow's Distinguished Service Cross citation reads:

General officer
In August 1969, Barrow was promoted to brigadier general, then deployed to Japan to serve as commanding general at Camp Butler in Okinawa. He received a Legion of Merit for his three years of service and left Okinawa as a major general select. On promotion to major general, he became commanding general of Marine Corps Recruit Depot, Parris Island.

Barrow was promoted to lieutenant general in 1975 and assigned to Headquarters Marine Corps as deputy chief of staff for manpower. In 1976, he was named commanding general of Fleet Marine Force, Atlantic, at Norfolk, Virginia. In July 1978, Barrow became the Assistant Commandant of the Marine Corps, serving until July 1979 when he became the Commandant of the Marine Corps. From 1978 to 1979, Barrow also served as president of the Marine Corps Association.

Barrow was the first commandant to serve, by law, as a regular full member of the Joint Chiefs of Staff. As commandant, "he was instrumental in acquiring approval of production for the Marine Corps of the American-modified Harrier aircraft, in awakening interest in new and improved naval gunfire support, in getting amphibious ships included in the navy's new construction programs, and in returning hospital ships to the fleet, especially on station with Marine Corps amphibious task forces."

In 1981, Barrow received the Golden Plate Award of the American Academy of Achievement presented by Awards Council member General David C. Jones, USAF.

Barrow retired from the Marine Corps on 30 June 1983, and was presented with the Navy Distinguished Service Medal upon retirement.

Military awards
Barrow's decorations, awards, and badges include:

Post-military career
After Barrow's retirement from the Marine Corps, he was appointed by President Ronald Reagan to the Foreign Intelligence Advisory Board and to the president's Blue Ribbon Commission on Defense Management.

In 1983, a letter from Barrow to Caspar W. Weinberger was released by the Pentagon. In the letter, Barrow criticized Israeli soldiers in Lebanon, saying that the Israelis were firing on United States troops, among other things. Israel denied the charges.

Barrow's wife of 53 years, Patty, died in 2005.

Barrow died on October 30, 2008, at the age of 86. He was survived by his sons Charles C. Pulliam, of Greenville, South Carolina, and Robert H. Barrow, a retired lieutenant colonel of Marines, of Tampa, Florida; his daughters Cathleen P. Harmon, of Killeen, Texas, Barbara B. Kanegaye, of Houston, Texas, and Mary B. Hannigan, of Oakton, Virginia, eleven grandchildren, and five great-grandchildren.

Barrow was buried with full military honors on November 3, 2008. The service was held at Grace Episcopal Church and Cemetery in St. Francisville, the seat of West Feliciana Parish, Louisiana. The Commandant of the Marine Corps, General James T. Conway, delivered the eulogy, recognizing Barrow for his many initiatives ranging from recruiting to training; while former Commandant General Carl Mundy presented the burial colors to Barrow's next of kin.

See also

 List of United States Marine Corps four-star generals
 List of Navy Cross recipients for the Korean War

References

 General Robert H. Barrow from Keystone Marines

External links
LPB –  General Robert H. Barrow 

1922 births
2008 deaths
United States Marine Corps personnel of the Korean War
United States Marine Corps personnel of the Vietnam War
United States Marine Corps personnel of World War II
Assistant Commandants of the United States Marine Corps
Louisiana State University alumni
Military personnel from Louisiana
National War College alumni
People from Baton Rouge, Louisiana
People from West Feliciana Parish, Louisiana
Recipients of the Defense Distinguished Service Medal
Recipients of the Distinguished Service Cross (United States)
Recipients of the Legion of Merit
5 Barrow, Robert H.
Recipients of the Navy Cross (United States)
Recipients of the Navy Distinguished Service Medal
Recipients of the Silver Star
Recipients of the Gallantry Cross (Vietnam)
United States Marine Corps Commandants
United States Marine Corps generals
United States Marine Corps officers